WSTR (94.1 MHz, "Star 94") is an FM radio station licensed to Smyrna, Georgia, and serving the Atlanta metropolitan area. Owned by Audacy, Inc., it broadcasts a rhythmic adult contemporary format. Its studios are located at Colony Square in Midtown Atlanta, while the station transmitter resides in Atlanta's Reynoldstown neighborhood.

History

Early years
The station signed on as WDJK on January 1, 1964, founded by WSMA (1550 AM) owner Mitchell Melof; WDJK operated as a simulcast of WSMA.

Jupiter Broadcasting of Georgia, then the owner of WQXI (790 AM), purchased WDJK in January 1965, with Kent Burkhart serving as vice president and general manager. WDJK's call sign was changed to WKXI and a beautiful music format was installed, with studios at 2970 Peachtree Road NW in Atlanta. The Pacific and Southern Company, forerunners to the modern-day Gannett and Tegna Inc., purchased WQXI and WKXI in November 1967.

WQXI-FM (1969-1989)
In 1969, the station changed its call letters to WQXI-FM to match its AM sister station.  In mid-1977, the station started calling itself "94Q" when WQXI's contemporary hit radio format was moved to the FM station.

Around 1987, WQXI-FM's audience share began to dwindle.  Various tweaks were made to the music mix, followed by an outright change of direction in late 1988 that competed head-to-head with then-dominant Top 40 outlet WAPW (99.7 FM) as "Atlanta's Hit Music, 94Q."  However, by the following spring, WQXI-FM had been soundly beaten, and the station began to purge most of its management and on-air talent.

WQXI-FM notably carried a smooth jazz-themed program called Jazz Flavors during the late 1980s. Despite the seeming incompatibility between it and contemporary hits, this program ran on WQXI-FM for several years, eventually serving as the genesis for the "Jazz Flavors" branding on WJZF (104.1 FM) when that station became the first one in the Atlanta market to adopt the format full-time.

WSTR (1989-present)
At midnight on November 15, 1989, "94Q" signed off after 12 years, with the final song being "Imagine" by John Lennon. 94.1 would then relaunch as "Star 94" with the call letters WSTR. The first song on "Star 94" was "Oh Atlanta" by Little Feat. The station's format was a hybrid of Hot AC and Top 40, best described as Adult Top 40. The station initially avoided most hip hop and rhythmic-oriented music hitting the Top 40 charts, though it added some rhythmic songs in the mid-1990s. Steve McCoy was brought in as morning show host and was paired with Vikki Locke; McCoy and Locke would helm the station's morning drive for the next 17 years.

After WAPW flipped to modern rock as WNNX in October 1992, WSTR was considered the "default" hit music station in Atlanta due to the lack of a mainstream Top 40 outlet; Atlanta once again had a mainstream Top 40 station in 2001 when WWWQ (100.5 FM) signed on.

Hot AC era (2010-2020)

In September 2010, Nielsen BDS moved WSTR from the CHR/Top 40 panel to the Adult Top 40 (Hot AC) panel, as the station became more identified with a Hot AC playlist.  WSTR changed its on-air slogan to "Your Life...Your Music," to emphasize its shift to Hot AC.  In February 2011, WSTR began programming all-1990s weekends, called "Big 90s Weekends" in response to the all-1980s weekends on WSB-FM (98.5). However, in the Fall of 2011, the station dropped the All-90s weekends.

Jefferson-Pilot Communications (and later Lincoln Financial Media) had owned WSTR and WQXI since 1974.  On December 8, 2014, Entercom announced its purchase of Lincoln Financial Media's entire 15-station lineup, including WSTR and WQXI, for $106.5 million.  The stations were operated under a local marketing agreement (LMA) until the sale was approved by the Federal Communications Commission (FCC). Entercom officially took over WSTR and WQXI on July 17, 2015; WQXI was spun off to Atlanta Radio Korea in 2016.

In November 2017, Entercom merged with CBS Radio, making WSTR co-owned with WZGC, WVEE-FM and WAOK.

In 2019, the station aired Christmas music during the holiday season for the first time.

Rhythmic AC era (2020-present)
On September 17, 2020, the station began teasing a "big announcement" to come at 3 p.m.; the use of the word "big" seemed to allude to previous reports the station was soon to flip to adult hits as "Big 94" (matching a similar recent format change on cross-country sister station WBGB in Boston). At that time, after playing "Closing Time" by Semisonic, WSTR instead relaunched with a rhythmic adult contemporary format, maintaining the Star branding while promoting the new focus as "The NEW Star 94" under the slogan "The Rhythm of ATL", with the first song being "Wanna Be Startin' Somethin'" by Michael Jackson.

Notable alumni
Several influential air personalities have worked at the station, including Ryan Seacrest. Seacrest interned on the night show with Tom Sullivan, who also helped train him; Sullivan gave Ryan his first "on air" shift, and eventually he began working weekends, Ryan did this while still attending Dunwoody High School.

HD Radio
The HD2 digital subchannel formerly aired a classic hits format under the brand "Star 94.1 HD2".

The HD3 channel formerly aired Audacy's LGBTQ+ talk/dance format "Channel Q". It has since moved to HD2 with the HD3 channel being turned off.

References

External links

STR
Rhythmic adult contemporary radio stations
Radio stations established in 1964
Audacy, Inc. radio stations